Thomas Henry Kirk (February 15, 1873 – October 3, 1940) was a Canadian politician. He served in the Legislative Assembly of British Columbia from 1928 to 1933 from the electoral district of Vancouver City, as a Conservative. He was also an alderman on the Vancouver City Council.

References

British Columbia Conservative Party MLAs
1873 births
1940 deaths
British emigrants to Canada